

A 

 Aa – Hubertus Antonius van der Aa (1935–2017)
 A.A.Burb. – Andrew A. Burbidge (fl. 2016)
 A.A.Cocucci –  (born 1959)
 A.A.Eaton – Alvah Augustus Eaton (1865–1908)
 A.A.Fisch.Waldh. – Alexandr Alexandrovich Fischer von Waldheim (1839–1920)
 A.Agostini – Angela Agostini (born 1880)
 A.A.Ham. – Arthur Andrew Hamilton (1855–1929)
 A.A.Hend. – Andrew Augustus Henderson (1816–1876)
 A.Ames – Adeline Ames (1879–1976)
 A.Anderson – Alexander Anderson (1748–1811)
 A.Arber – Agnes Arber (1879–1960)
 Aarons. – Aaron Aaronsohn (1876–1919)
 Aase – Hannah Caroline Aase (1883–1980)
 A.Barbero – Andrés Barbero (1877–1951)
 A.Bassi – Agostino Bassi (1773–1856)
 A.Baytop – Asuman Baytop (1920–2015)
 Abbayes – Henry Nicollon des Abbayes (1898–1974)
 Abbiatti – Delia Abbiatti (born 1918)
 Abbot – John Abbot (1751–c. 1840)
 Abedin –  (fl. 1986)
 Aberc. – Henry McLaren, 2nd Baron Aberconway (1879–1953)
 A.Berger – Alwin Berger (1871–1931)
 A.B.Frank – Albert Bernhard Frank (1839–1900)
 A.B.Graf – Alfred Byrd Graf (1901–2001)
 A.B.Jacks. – Albert Bruce Jackson (1876–1947)
 A.B.Nickels – Anna Buck Nickels (1832–1917)
 A.Bloxam – Andrew Bloxam (1801–1878)
 A.Blytt – Axel Gudbrand Blytt (1843–1898)
 A.Br. – Addison Brown (1830–1913)
 Abramov – Ivan N. Abramov (1884–1953)
 Abrams – LeRoy Abrams (1874–1956)
 A.Braun – Alexander Karl Heinrich Braun (1805–1877)
 Abrom. – Johannes Abromeit (1857–1946)
 A.Bruggen – Adolph Cornelis van Bruggen (born 1929)
 A.Butler –  (born 1946)
 A.Cabrera – Ángel Cabrera (1879–1960) (not to be confused with botanist Ángel Lulio Cabrera (1908–1999))
 A.Camus – Aimée Antoinette Camus (1879–1965)
 A.Cast. –  (1896–1968)
 Acerbi – Giuseppe Acerbi (1773–1846)
 Ach. – Erik Acharius (1757–1819)
 A.C.H.Blinks – Anne Catherine Hof Blinks (1903–1995)
 A.Chev. – Auguste Jean Baptiste Chevalier (1873–1956)
 Achv. – Agazi Asaturovich Achverdov (born 1907)
 Acloque – Alexandre Noël Charles Acloque (1871–1908)
 A.C.Schultz – August Christian Schultz (1813–1908)
 A.C.Sm. – Albert Charles Smith (1906–1999)
 Acuña – Julián Acuña Galé (1900–1973)
 A.Cunn. – Allan Cunningham (1791–1839)
 A.C.White – Alain Campbell White (1880–1951)
 Adamović – Lujo Adamović (1864–1935) 
 Adams – Johann Friedrich Adam (1780–1838)
 Adamson – Robert Stephen Adamson (1885–1965)
 Adans. – Michel Adanson (1727–1806)
 A.DC. – Alphonse Louis Pierre Pyrame de Candolle (1806–1893)
 A.D.Danilov – Alexander Danilovich Danilov (born 1903)
 Ade –  (1876–1968)
 Adelb. –  (1914–1972)
 Adema – Fredericus Arnoldus Constantin Basil Adema (born 1939)
 Aderh. – Rudolf Ferdinand Theodor Aderhold (1865–1907)
 A.D.Hardy – Alfred Douglas Hardy (1870–1958)
 A.D.Hawkes – Alex Drum Hawkes (1927–1977)
 A.Dietr. – Albert Gottfried Dietrich (1795–1856)
 Adolf – Nina Avgustinovna Adolf (1903–1951)
 A.D.Poulsen – Axel Dalberg Poulsen (born 1961) 
 A.D.Slavin – Arthur Daniel Slavin (1903–1973)
 A.E.D.Daniels – Albert Ebenezer Dulip Daniels (born 1964)
 A.E.Hoffm. – Adriana Hoffmann (born 1940)
 A.E.Holland – Ailsa E. Holland (fl. 1988)
 Aellen – Paul Aellen (1896–1973)
 A.E.Murray – Albert Edward Murray (born 1935] 
 A.E.Newton – Angela E. Newton (born 1958] 
 A.E.Ortmann – Arnold Edward Ortmann (1863–1927)
 A.E.Reuss – August Emanuel von Reuss (1811–1873)
 A.Ernst – Alfred Ernst (1875–1968)
 A.Evans – Alexander William Evans (1868–1959)
 A.E.van Wyk – Abraham Erasmus van Wyk (born 1952)
 A.E.Wade – Arthur Edwin Wade (1895–1989) 
 A.-E.Wolf – Anne-Elizabeth Wolf (fl. 1998)
 A.F.Bartsch – Alfred Frank Bartsch (1913–2009)
 A.Fedtsch. – Alexei Pavlovich Fedchenko (1844–1873)
 A.Fisch. – Alfred Fischer (1858–1913)
 Afonina – Olga Mikhailovna Afonina (born 1945)
 A.F.Rob. – A.F. Robinson (fl. 2015)
 A.F.Tryon – Alice Faber Tryon (1920–2009)
 Afzel. – Adam Afzelius (1750–1837)
 Agashe – Shripad Narayan Agashe (1939–)
 Agerer –  (born 1947)
 A.G.Floyd – Alexander G. Floyd (1926–2022)
 A.G.Ham. – Alexander Greenlaw Hamilton (1852–1941) 
 A.Gibson – Alexander Gibson (1800–1867)
 A.G.Jones – Almut Gitter Jones (1923–2013)
 A.G.Lyon – Alexander Geoffrey Lyon (fl. 1950–1960)
 A.G.Mill. –  (born 1951)
 Agra – Maria de Fátima Agra (born 1952)
 A.Gray – Asa Gray (1810–1888)
 A.Ham. –  (fl. 1832)
 A.Hässl. – Arne Hässler (1904–1952)
 A.Hay – Alistair Hay (born 1955)
 A.Heller – Amos Arthur Heller (1867–1944)
 A.Hend. – Archibald Henderson (born 1921)
 A.Henry – Augustine Henry (1857–1930)
 A.H.Evans – Arthur Humble Evans (1855–1943)
 A.H.Gentry – Alwyn Howard Gentry (1945–1993)
 A.H.Heller –  (1894–1973)
 A.H.Holmgren –  (1912–1992)
 A.H.Kent – Adolphus Henry Kent (1828–1913)
 Ahmadjian – Vernon Ahmadjian (1930–2012)
 Ahrendt – Leslie Walter Allen Ahrendt (1903–1969)
 A.H.S.Lucas – Arthur Henry Shakespeare Lucas (1853–1936)
 A.Huet – Alfred Huet du Pavillon (1829–1907)
 Ainslie – Whitelaw Ainslie (1767–1837) 
 Ainsw. – Geoffrey Clough Ainsworth (1905–1998)
 Airy Shaw – Herbert Kenneth Airy Shaw (1902–1985)
 Aitch. – James Edward Tierney Aitchison (1836–1898)
 Aiton – William Aiton (1731–1793)
 A.Jaeger – August Jaeger (1842–1877)
 A.J.Eames – Arthur Johnson Eames (1881–1969)
 A.J.Ford – Andrew James Ford (born 1967)
 A.J.G.Wilson – Annette Jane Gratton Wilson (born 1960)
 A.J.Hend. – Andrew Henderson (born 1950)
 A.J.Hill – Albert Joseph Hill (born 1940)
 A.J.M.Baker – Alan John Martin Baker (born 1948)
 A.J.Paton – Alan James Paton (born 1963)
 A.J.Scott – Andrew John Scott (born 1950)
 A.Juss. – Adrien-Henri de Jussieu (1797–1853)
 Aké Assi – Laurent Aké Assi (1931–2014)
 A.Kern. – Anton Kerner von Marilaun (1831–1898)
 Akeroyd – John Akeroyd (born 1952)
 Akhani –  (born 1950)
 A.K.Irvine – Anthony Kyle Irvine (born 1937)
 A.K.Skvortsov – Alexey Skvortsov (1920–2008)
 A.K.S.Prasad – Akshinthala K. Sai Krishna Prasad (born 1949)
 A.Kurz – Albert Kurz (1886–1948)
 A.K.Wallace – Anne Karin Wallace (fl. 1997)
 Alain – Henri Alain Liogier (1916–2009)
 A.L.Andrews – Albert LeRoy Andrews (1878–1961)
 Alb. – Johannes Baptista von Albertini (1769–1831)
 Albov – Nikolai Michailovich Albov (1866–1897)
 Albr. – David Edward Albrecht (born 1962)
 Al.Brongn. – Alexandre Brongniart (1770–1847)
 Albuq. – Byron Wilson Pereira de Albuquerque (1932–2003)
 Alcaraz –  (born 1958)
 Alderw. – Cornelis Rugier Willem Karel van Alderwerelt van Rosenburgh (1863–1936)
 Aldrovandi – Ulisse Aldrovandi (1522–1605)
 Alef. – Friedrich Georg Christoph Alefeld (1820–1872)
 A.Lem. – Adrien Lemaire (1852–1902)
 A.Lesson – Pierre Adolphe Lesson (1805–1888)
 Alexander – Edward Johnston Alexander (1901–1985)
 Alexeeva – N. B. Alexeeva (fl. 2006)
 A.L.Grant – Adele Gerard Lewis Grant (1881–1969) 
 Ali – Syed Irtifaq Ali (born 1930)
 Alison Stewart – Alison Stewart (born 1957)
 Al.Jahn – Alfredo Jahn (1867–1940)
 All. – Carlo Allioni (1728–1804)
 A.L.Lamb – Anthony L. Lamb (born 1937)
 Allan – Harry Howard Barton Allan (1882–1957)
 Alleiz. – Aymar Charles d'Alleizette (1884–1967)
 Allemão – Francisco Freire Allemão e Cysneiro (1797–1874)
 Allen – Timothy Field Allen (1837–1902) 
 Allred – Kelly Allred (born 1949)
 Alm – Carl Gustav Alm (1888–1962)
 Almeda – Frank Almeda (born 1946)
 Á.Löve – Áskell Löve (1916–1994)
 Alphand – Jean-Charles Adolphe Alphand (1817–1891)
 Alph.Wood – Alphonso Wood (1810–1881)
 Alpino – Prospero Alpinio (1553–1617)
 Al-Shehbaz – Ihsan Ali Al-Shehbaz (born 1939)
 A.L.Sm. – Annie Lorrain Smith (1854–1937)
 Alston – Arthur Hugh Garfit Alston (1902–1958)
 Alstr. – Clas Alströmer (1736–1794)
 Altam. – Fernando Altamirano (1848–1908)
 Altschul – Siri von Reis (born 1931)
 A.Lyons – Albert Brown Lyons (1841–1926)
 A.Macedo – Amaro Macedo (born 1914)
 Amakawa – Tairoko Amakawa (born 1917)
 Amann – Johann Amann (1814–1878)
 Amaral – Ayrton Amaral (born 1948)
 A.M.Ashby – Alison Marjorie Ashby (1901–1987)
 A.Massal. – Abramo Bartolommeo Massalongo (1824–1860)
 A.Mathews – Andrew Mathews (1801–1841)
 Amberg – Otto Amberg (1875–1920)
 Ambronn – Hermann Ambronn (1856–1927)
 Ambrosetti – José Arturo Ambrosetti (born 1939)
 Ambrosi – Francesco Ambrosi (1821–1897)
 Ambroz – Josef Ambroz (1886–1950)
 A.M.Buchanan – Alex M. Buchanan (born 1944)
 A.M.Carter – Annetta Mary Carter (1907–1991)
 A.M.Cowan – Adeline May Cowan (1892–1921) 
 A.Meeuse –  (1914–2010)
 Ameljcz. – V. P. Ameljczenko (born 1948)
 Ames – Oakes Ames (1874–1950)
 A.M.Gray – Alan Maurice Gray (born 1943)
 Amich – Francisco Amich García (born 1953)
 Amici – Giovanni Battista Amici (1786–1863)
 Amin – Amal Amin (born 1929)
 Amirkh. – Amirkhan Magomedovich Amirkhanov (born 1952)
 Amman – Johann Amman (1707–1741)
 Ammann – Morgane Ammann (born 1986)
 Ammerman – Elizabeth Ammerman (born 1917)
 Ammirati – Joseph F. Ammirati (born 1942)
 Amo – Mariano del Amo y Mora (1809–1896)
 Amor – Angel Amor Morales (born 1959)
 A.M.Ragonese – Ana Maria Ragonese (1928–1999) 
 A.M.Ross – Alexander Milton Ross (1832–1897)
 Amshoff – Gerda Jane Hillegonda Amshoff (1913–1985)
 Amsler – Charles D. Amsler (born 1959)
 A.M.Sm. – Annie Morrill Smith (1856–1946)
 A.Murray – Andrew Murray (1812–1878)
 A.N.Danilov – Afanasij Nikolaevich Danilov (1903–1942)
 A.N.Demidov – Anatoly Nikolaievich Demidov, 1st Prince of San Donato (1813–1870)
 Anderb. – Arne A. Anderberg (born 1954)
 Andersen – Johannes Carl Andersen (1873–1962)
 Anderson – James Anderson (1738–1809)
 Andersson – Nils Johan Andersson (1821–1880)
 Andr. – Gábor Andreánszky (1895–1967)
 André – Édouard André (1840–1911)
 Andres – Heinrich Andres (1883–1970)
 Andrews – Henry Cranke Andrews (c. 1759–1835)
 Andr.Hend. – Andrew Henderson (c. 1823–1906)
 Andriamih. – Tefy H. Andriamihajarivo (fl. 2011)
 Andronov – Nikolaĭ Matveevich Andronov (fl. 1955)
 Andrz. – Antoni Lukianowicz Andrzejowski (1785–1868)
 A.Nelson – Aven Nelson (1859–1952) (A.Nels. is also used)
 A.Neumann – Alfred Neumann (1916–1973)
 Angely. – João Alberto Angely (born 1917)
 Ångstr. – Johan Ångström (1813–1879)
 A.N.Henry – Ambrose Nathaniel Henry (born 1936)
 A.N.Rao – Abbareddy Nageswara Rao (born 1954)
 Ant.Juss. – Antoine de Jussieu (1686–1758)
 Ant.Molina – José Antonio Molina Rosito (born 1926)
 Antoine – Franz Antoine (1815–1886)
 Ant.Schott – Anton Schott (1866–1945)
 Anzi – Martino Anzi (1812–1883)
 A.O.S.Vieira – Ana Odete Santos Vieira (born 1958)
 Apang – Ona Apang (fl. 2012)
 A.P.Br. – Andrew Phillip Brown (born 1951)
 A.Pearson – Arthur Anselm Pearson (1874–1954)
 A.Phelps – Almira Hart Lincoln Phelps (1793–1884)
 Applegate – Elmer Ivan Applegate (1867–1949)
 A.Pramanik – Arabinda Pramanik (born 1957)
 Apstein – Carl Heinrich Apstein (1862–1950)
 A.Q.Hu – Ai Qun Hu (fl. 2009)
 A.Raynal – Aline Marie Raynal (born 1937)
 A.R.Bean – Anthony Bean (born 1957)
 Arcang. – Giovanni Arcangeli (1840–1921)
 A.R.Chapm. – Alexander Robert Chapman (born 1959)
 Archer – Thomas Croxen Archer (1817–1885)
 Archer-Hind – Thomas H. Archer-Hind (fl. 1880)
 A.R.Clapham – Arthur Roy Clapham (1904–1990)
 Ard. – Pietro Arduino (1728–1805)
 Ardoino –  (1819–1874)
 Arechav. – José Arechavaleta (1838–1912)
 A.Regel – Johann Albert von Regel (1845–1908)
 Arenb – Florence Freida Arenberg (1907–1995)
 Arènes – Jean Arènes (1898–1960)
 Aresch. – Johan Erhard Areschoug (1811–1887)
 A.R.Ferguson – Allan Ross Ferguson (born 1943)
 Argent –  (born 1941)
 Argus – George William Argus (1929–2022)
 A.Rich. – Achille Richard (1794–1852)
 Ariza – Luis Ariza Espinar (1933–2020) (L.Ariza is also used)
 Arm. – Edward Armitage (1822–1906)
 Armari – Beatrice Armari (1877–1918)
 Arn. – George Arnott Walker-Arnott (1799–1868)
 Arnell – Hampus Wilhelm Arnell (1848–1932)
 Arnold – Ferdinand Christian Gustav Arnold (1828–1901)
 A.Robyns –  (1935–2003)
 A.R.Penfold – Arthur de Ramon Penfold (1890–1980)
 Arráb. –  (1771–1850)
 Arruda – Manuel Arruda da Câmara (1752–1810)
 Arsène – Gustave Arsène (1867–1938)
 A.R.Sm. – Alan Reid Smith (born 1943)
 Art.Castro – Arturo Castro-Castro (born 1979)
 Arthur – Joseph Charles Arthur (1850–1942)
 Art.Mey. – Arthur Meyer (1850–1922)
 Artz – Lena Clemmons Artz (1891–1976)
 A.R.Vickery – Albert Roy Vickery (born 1947)
 Arv.-Touv. – Casimir Arvet-Touvet (1841–1913)
 A.S.Calvert – Amelia Smith Calvert (1876–1965)
 Asch. – Paul Friedrich August Ascherson (1834–1913)
 A.Schatz – Albert Schatz (1920–2005)
 A.Schenk – Alexander Schenk (1864–1924)
 A.Schimp. – Andreas Franz Wilhelm Schimper (1856–1901)
 A.Schlag. – Adolf Schlagintweit (1829–1857)
 A.Schlick. – August Schlickum (1867–1946)
 A.Schneid. – Albert Schneider (1863–1928)
 A.Schnyd. – Albert Schnyder (1856–1938)
 A.Schott – Arthur Carl Victor Schott (1814–1875)
 A.Schreib. – Annelis Schreiber (1927– 2010)
 A.Schultz – Arthur Schultz (1838–1915)
 A.S.Foster – Adriance S. Foster (1901–1973)
 A.S.George – Alex George (born 1939)
 Ashby – Edwin Ashby (1861–1941)
 Ashe – William Willard Ashe (1872–1932)
 Ashton – Ruth Elizabeth Ashton (1896–1987)
 Ashwin – Margot Bernice Ashwin (1935–1992)
 A.Sinclair – Andrew Sinclair (1796–1861)
 Askerova – Rosa K. Askerova (born 1929)
 Asmussen – Conny Asmussen (fl. 1997)
 A.Soriano – Alberto Soriano (1920–1998)
 A.Spreng. – Anton Sprengel (1803–1851)
 A.S.Rob. – Alastair Robinson (born 1980)
 Assem – J. van den Assem (fl. 1953)
 Ast – Suzanne Jovet-Ast (1914–2006)
 A.Stahl – Agustín Stahl (1842–1917)
 A.St.-Hil. – Augustin Saint-Hilaire (1799–1853)
 Aston – Helen Isobel Aston (born 1934)
 Astuti – Inggit Pudji Astuti (fl. 2004)
 Aswal – B. S. Aswal (born 1948)
 A.Terracc. –  (1861–1917)
 A.T.Grimme – Arnold Grimme (1868–1958)
 Atha – Daniel E. Atha (born 1962) 
 A.Thouars – Abel Aubert du Petit-Thouars (1793–1864)
 Atk. – William Sackston Atkinson (1821–1875)
 A.T.Lee – Alma Theodora Lee (1912–1990)
 A.T.M.Pedersen — Anne Tiril Myhre Pedersen (fl. 2017)
 Aubl. – Jean Baptiste Christophore Fusée Aublet (1720–1778)
 Aubrév. – André Aubréville (1897–1982)
 Aubriet – Claude Aubriet (1651–1742)
 Aucher – Pierre Martin Rémi Aucher-Éloy (1792–1838)
 Audas – James Wales Claredon Audas (1872–1959)
 Audib. – Urbain Audibert (1791–1846)
 Audubon – John James Audubon (1785–1851)
 Aug.DC. – Richard Émile Augustin de Candolle (1868–1920)
 Augustine – Jomy Augustine (fl. 1998)
 Ausserd. – Anton Ausserdorfer (1836–1885) 
 A.Usteri – Alfred Usteri (1869–1948)
 Austin – Coe Finch Austin (1831–1880)
 A.Vázquez – Antonio Vázquez (born 1961)
 A.V.Bobrov – Alexey Vladimir Bobrov (born 1969)
 A.V.Duthie – Augusta Vera Duthie (1881–1963)
 Avé-Lall. – Julius Léopold Eduard Avé-Lallemant (1803–1867)
 Aver. –  (born 1955)
 Averett – John Earl Averett (1943–2017)
 Avers – Charlotte J. Avers (fl. 1953)
 Averyanova – Anna Leonidovna Averyanova (born 1981)
 A.V.Gilman – Arthur V. Gilman (fl. 2003)
 A.V.Roberts – Andrew Vaughan Roberts (born 1940)
 A.Wall – Arnold Wall (1869–1966)
 A.Wallace – Alexander Wallace (1829–1899)
 A.W.Benn. – Alfred William Bennett (1833–1902)
A.W.Archer – Alan W. Archer (born 1930)
 A.Weber – Anton Weber (born 1947)
 A.W.Hill – Arthur William Hill (1875–1941)
 A.W.Howitt – Alfred William Howitt (1830–1908)
 A.Wigg. – Heinrich August Ludwig Wiggers (1803–1880)
 A.W.Purdie – Andrew William Purdie (1940–1989)
 A.W.Russell – Anna Worsley Russell (1807–1876)
 Axelrod – Daniel I. Axelrod (1910–1998)
 Aymard –  (born 1959)
 Ayres – William Port Ayres (1815–1875)
 Azara – Félix de Azara (1746–1821)

B–Z 

To find entries for B–Z, use the table of contents above.

 
1

Botanists